Neparholaspis is a genus of mites in the family Parholaspididae. There are about nine described species in Neparholaspis.

Species
These nine species belong to the genus Neparholaspis:
 Neparholaspis cardioides Petrova, 1977
 Neparholaspis dubatolovi
 Neparholaspis evansi Krantz, 1960
 Neparholaspis longilingulatus Tseng, 1993
 Neparholaspis monticola Ishikawa, 1979
 Neparholaspis serratichela Ishikawa, 1979
 Neparholaspis serrtichela Ishikawa, 1967
 Neparholaspis shinanonis Ishikawa, 1979
 Neparholaspis unicus Petrova, 1967

References

Parholaspididae
Articles created by Qbugbot